Slavasshøgda  is a hill (elevation 336 meters), located in the Norwegian former county Østfold, within the borders of the former municipality of Rømskog.

It is the highest point in the region of Østfold

See also
 List of highest points of Norwegian counties

Hills of Norway
Landforms of Viken (county)
Rømskog